Barrallier may refer to:

Francis Barrallier
Barrallier Island
Barrallier, New South Wales